Skinker is a St. Louis MetroLink subway station. It is located beneath the intersection of Skinker Boulevard and Forest Park Parkway near the boundary of St. Louis and University City, Missouri and serves the eastern portion of Washington University's main campus, the western portion of Forest Park, and area residents in surrounding neighborhoods.

The station's entrances are clad in brick that matches neighboring buildings on Washington University's campus.

In 2006, Metro's Arts in Transit program commissioned the work Speed Shift by Erwin Redl for installation in the station. Located on the mezzanine crosswalk overlooking the platforms, two pairs of rectangular LED boards face each other from both ends of the gangway. Strips of horizontal light zip towards the centers of the rectangles in accordance with synchronized beeping sounds.

Station layout
There are two entrances to the station, one on the northeast corner of the intersection of Skinker Boulevard and Forest Park Parkway featuring stairs and an elevator, and one on the southwest corner featuring stairs and a ramp. Each entrance leads to a bridge over the tracks from which both platforms can be accessed.

The station is located underground, but the tracks are located above-ground immediately outside of the station in both directions; on the south side of Forest Park Parkway to the east of the station and on the north side to the west.

References

External links 
 
 St. Louis Metro

MetroLink stations in St. Louis
Blue Line (St. Louis MetroLink)
Railway stations located underground in Missouri
Railway stations in Missouri at university and college campuses
Railway stations in the United States opened in 2006